Saint James School of Medicine (SJSM) is a private for-profit offshore medical school with two basic science campuses,  one in  British Overseas Territory of Anguilla, and the other in Saint Vincent and the Grenadines, it is considered one school with two campuses. Saint James confers upon its graduates the Doctor of Medicine (M.D.) degree.

History
Saint James School of Medicine was originally established in Bonaire in 1999 and began instruction in 2000.

In 2006 the people of Bonaire, Sint Eustatius and Saba agreed to dissolve the Netherlands Antilles. Upon the imminent dissolution of the country, the ministers of health of the Netherlands and the Netherlands Antilles requested Accreditation Organisation of the Netherlands and Flanders (NVAO) to assess the quality of all medical schools in the Netherlands Antilles. The medical school in the island of Saba was the only one to successfully receive NVAO accreditation. The rest of the schools, including St. James School of Medicine, decided to relocate their campuses. In 2010, Saint James opened a second campus in Anguilla.

In 2014, the School opened a third campus in St. Vincent and the Grenadines, and began merging the Bonaire campus into the Saint Vincent and the Grenadines campus on the main island of Saint Vincent. At the end of the Fall 2015 semester, Saint James moved its Bonaire operation, students, and faculty to the St. Vincent and the Grenadines campus. They also transferred their IMED listing.

In 2022 a Medpage Today article reported an FTC complaint alleging that "the school misrepresented its U.S. Medical Licensing Examination (USMLE) Step 1 pass rate in sales calls, presentations, and marketing materials. One brochure claimed a 96.77% first-time USMLE Step 1 pass ratebut the school's actual pass rate is around 35%, according to the FTC" (Case No. 1:22-cv-1919). "Saint James School of Medicineand its Illinois-based operatorswill have to pay $1.2 million toward refunds and debt cancellation for students harmed by its deceptive marketing, according to an FTC press release." The school refuted these allegations in their statement saying that they settled to avoid lengthy and expensive legal proceeding with the FTC.

Curriculum
The MD program at Saint James is a 10 semester course of study that consists of three semesters per calendar year, each semester lasting four months. Semesters 1-5 are basic sciences completed at one of the school's two Caribbean campuses (Anguilla and St. Vincent and the Grenadines). Semester 5 (Advanced Introduction to Clinical Medicine) was completed at Jackson Park Hospital in Chicago, Illinois, but the location of completion of this semester has since been changed. Starting in September 2017, semester 5 will be completed in one of the two school campuses in either Saint Vincent or Anguilla. After completion, students are expected to complete the United States Medical Licensing Exam (USMLE) Step 1, for which the school offers a pass guarantee  In addition, the school has begun offering extended programs for students in the Basic Science program, offering the normal 5 semester Basic Science program, as well as a 6 and 7 semester Basic Science program.

The Clinical Science portion consists of semesters 6-10 that involve 96 weeks of clinical study that are completed at affiliated hospitals and clinical facilities in the United States. The website lists the following hospitals that it is affiliated with: 
 Jackson Park Hospital (Chicago, Illinois)
 South Texas Health System (McAllen, Texas)
 West Suburban Hospital (Oak Park, Illinois)
 Sentara Healthcare (Norfolk, Williamsburg and Virginia Beach, Virginia)
 Metro South Medical Center (Blue Island, Illinois)
 Genesys Regional Medical Center (Grand Blanc, Michigan)
 John H. Stroger, Jr. Hospital of Cook County (Chicago, Illinois)
 Raleigh General Hospital (Beckley, West Virginia)
 Appalachian Regional Hospital (Beckley, West Virginia)
 Pikeville Medical Center (Pikeville, Kentucky)
 Appalachian Regional Healthcare (Hazard, Kentucky)
 EvergreenHealth (Seattle, Washington)
 Mercy Hospital NWA Communities (Rogers, Arkansas)
 Delta Regional Medical Center (Greenville, Mississippi)
 Brentwood Hospital (Shreveport, Louisiana)
 Griffin Memorial Hospital (Norman, Oklahoma)

Accreditation
Both of Saint James School of Medicine's campuses are listed in the World Directory of Medical Schools (WDMS). Graduates of Saint James are eligible for the United States Medical Licensing Examination (USMLE) and ECFMG Certification, as well as the Canadian Medical Licensing Exams (Medical Council of Canada Qualifying Examination).

In September 2009, the Caribbean Accreditation Authority for Education in Medicine and other Health Professions (CAAM-HP) granted Saint James' Anguilla campus initial accreditation as a developing school. In July 2015, CAAM-HP extended Saint James' Anguilla campus' initial provisional accreditation with probation for one year, until 2016. The Anguilla campus' CAAM-HP initial provisional accreditation with probation was extended for one year in July 2016. In August 2018, CAAM-HP extended Saint James' initial provisional accreditation again for one year.

As of May 24, 2019, the Accreditation Commission of Colleges of Medicine granted Saint James School of Medicine conditional accreditation for three years, until May 21, 2022.

The St. Vincent campus is registered with the National Accreditation Board (NAB) of the Government of St. Vincent and the Grenadines. And is operating under a provisional accreditation from CAAM-HP. The campus was recently assessed for certification and is waiting on results.

Financial Aid
Saint James School of Medicine (SJSM) has entered into an arrangement with Delta Financial Solutions, Inc. (Delta) to provide qualified students with a private student loan program.

Student life
Students have clubs that they can join, including an AMSA chapter, a Phi Chi chapter, as well as other clubs. The student body also volunteers to operate health screenings for the local community.

See also
Education in Anguilla
List of schools in Anguilla
List of medical schools in the Caribbean

References

External links

Saint James School of Medicine Student Government Association of Saint Vincent and the Grenadines
https://www.accredmed.org/accredited-schools/

Schools of medicine in Bonaire
Education in Anguilla
Medical schools in the Caribbean